Preya Dechdumrong (born 24 January 1945) is a Thai sprinter. She competed in the women's 4 × 100 metres relay at the 1964 Summer Olympics.

References

1945 births
Living people
Athletes (track and field) at the 1964 Summer Olympics
Preya Dechdumrong
Preya Dechdumrong
Place of birth missing (living people)
Olympic female sprinters